The dassie rat (Petromus typicus) is an African rodent found among rocky outcroppings.  It is the only living member of its genus, Petromus, and family, Petromuridae.  The name "dassie" means "hyrax" in Afrikaans, and the two animals are found in similar habitats.  Petromus means "rock mouse" and dassie rats are one of many rodents sometimes called rock rats.  The family and genus names are sometimes misspelled as Petromyidae and Petromys.

Characteristics 
Dassie rats are squirrel-like in appearance. Their tails are hairy, but not bushy whereas the soles of their feet are distinctly bare and have pads. Their heads are noticeably flattened. The overall coloration can be a range of browns, greys, or almost black. The nose is yellowish and tends to stand out. They have no underfur. The teats are located on the sides of the torso, which allows the young to feed from the side when crammed in a narrow rock crevice.

Natural history 
Dassie rats are restricted to rocky outcrops in Namibia, parts of Angola, and northwest South Africa. They are famous for being able to squeeze into extremely narrow crevices. This is accomplished due to their flattened skulls and flexible ribs.

Dassie rats feed primarily on grasses, but will sometimes eat fruits, seeds, and leaves. They have high crowned and rooted cheek teeth. Females give birth to a pair of offspring just once a year, an unusually slow reproductive rate among rodents.

Relatives 
Dassie rats are the only remaining members of a once-diverse family that first appeared in the Oligocene of Africa. Both morphological and molecular studies suggest the closest living relatives to the dassie rats are the African cane rats in the family Thryonomyidae. These two families, along with related fossil families such as †Phiomyidae, represented an important early radiation of rodents in Africa.

References

Further reading 
Kingdon, J. 1997. The Kingdon Field Guide to African Mammals. Academic Press Limited, London.
McKenna, Malcolm C., and Bell, Susan K. 1997. Classification of Mammals Above the Species Level. Columbia University Press, New York, 631 pp. 
Nowak, R. M. 1999. Walker's Mammals of the World, Vol. 2. Johns Hopkins University Press, London.

External links 
Animal Diversity Web site about dassie rats
The Dassie Rat, Focusing On Wildlife
The Dassie Rat – a rodent that chews the cud

Hystricognath rodents
Rodents of Africa
Mammals described in 1831
Extant Pleistocene first appearances